Denmark has issued stamps since 1851. The first person to be featured on a Danish stamp was King Christian IX.  The years appearing after each name refer to when that person was first featured on a stamp.

This list is complete through early 2003.

 Danish West Indies

A 
Nicolai A. Abildgaard (1984)
Peder Christian Abildgaard (1973)
Søren Abildgaard (1998)
Absalon, Archbishop and statesman (1980)
Alexandrine of Mecklenburg-Schwerin (1939 semi-postal)
Michael Ancher (1996)
Hans Christian Andersen (1935)
Ib Andersen (1991)
Mogens Andersen (1998)
Valdemar Andersen (1991)
Anne-Marie of Denmark Queen consort of Greece (1950 semi-postal)

B 
Otto Bache (1976)
Jens Bang (1978)
Poul Anker Bech (2003)
Wilhelm Bendz (1994)
Benedikte, Princess of Denmark (1964 semi-postal)
Vitus Bering (1941)
Ejler Bille (1987)
Thorvald Bindesbøll (1996)
Jens Birkemose (2002)
Steen Steensen Blicher (1982)
Karen Blixen (a.k.a. Isak Dinesen) (1980)
Thor Bogelund (1993)
Niels Bohr (1963)
Kay Bojesen (1989)
August Bournonville (1979)
Tycho Brahe (1946)
Georg Brandes (1971)
Sven Brasch (1991)
Stig Brøgger (1993)

C 
Georg Carstensen (1962)
Povl Christensen (1970)
Christian IV of Denmark (1924)
Christian V of Denmark (1983)
Christian IX of Denmark (1904)
Christian X of Denmark (1913)
Franciska Clausen (1993)
Saint Canute IV of Denmark (1985)

D 
Enrico Mylius Dalgas (1966)
Henning Damgaard-Sorensen|Henning Damgaard-Sørensen (2001)
Magrius Otto Sophus Count Danneskjold-Samsoe (2001)
Leon Degand (1988)
Johan Hendrik Deuntzer (2000)
Carl aodor Dreyer (1989)

E 
Caroline Ebbeson (1985 semi-postal)
Christoffer Wilhelm Eckersberg (1983)
Hans Egede (1971)
Jacob Christian Hansen Ellehammer (1956)
Eric of Pomerania (1997)
Edvard Eriksen (1989)

F 
[Martinus William Ferslew (2001)
Mathilde Fibiger (1971)
Niels R. Finsen (1960)
Ole Fick (2003)
Wilhelm Freddie (1993)
Frederik V of Denmark (1937)
Frederik VII of Denmark (1975)
Frederik VIII of Denmark (1907)
Frederik IX of Denmark (1948)
Frederik, Crown Prince of Denmark (1969 semi-postal)
Lorenz Frølich (1975)

G 
Jacob Gade (1979)
Vincenzo Galeotti (1986)
Johan Vilhelm Gertner (1982)
Harald Giersing (1991)
N. F. S. Grundtvig (1972)

H 
Vilhelm Hammershoi (1997)
Constantin Hansen (1989)
Emil Christian Hansen (1976)
Peter Hansen (1988)
Vilhelm Hansen (2002)
Hanne Hastrup (2002)
Osvald Helmuth (1999)
Poul Henningsen (1991)
Sys Hindsbo (2003)
Ludvig Holberg (1972)

I 
Bernhard Severin Ingemann (1989)
Ingrid of Sweden (1941 semi-postal)
Bodil Ipsen (1989)
Pieter Isaacsz (1988)

J 
Jacob Christian Jacobsen (1947)
Robert Jacobsen (1985)
Georg Jensen (1966)
Johannes Vilhelm Jensen (1973)
Frantz Christopher von Jessen (2001)
Phillip Stein Jönsson (1992)
Johan Knud Victor Rasmussen (1933)

K 
Preben Kaas (1999)
Frans Kannik (2002)
Søren Aabye Kierkegaard (1955, 2013)
Per Kirkeby (1998)
Kirsten Klein (2002)
Thomas Kluge (1999)
Christen Købke (1989)
Johan Peter Koch (1994)
Christen Mikkelsen Kold (1966)
August Krogh (1980)
Axel Johannes Krøyer (1990)
Peder Severin Krøyer (1988)

L 
Niels Lergaard (1995)
Jørn Larsen (2001)
Johan Thomas Lundbye (1992)
Vilhelm Lundstrøm (1993)

M 
Peter Madsen (2002)
Lise Malinovsky (1999)
Margaret I of Denmark (1992)
Margrea II of Denmark (1941 semi-postal)
Wilhelm Marstrand (1984)
Andrew Mitchell (1990), introduced a steam engine into Denmark in 1790
Jorgen Mogensen (1992)
Flemming Quist Møller (2002)
Henrik, Prince Consort of Denmark (1967)
Bernard Law Montgomery (1995)
Kaj Munk (1981)

N 
Martin Andersen Nexø (1969)
Asta Nielsen (1996)
Carl Nielsen (1965)
Ejnar Nielsen (1966)

O 
Adam Gottlob Oehlenschläger (1979)
Hans Christian Ørsted (1951)

P 
Dirch Passer (1999)
Carl-Henning Pedersen (1987)
Vilhelm Pedersen (1975)
Kjeld Petersen (1999)
Robert Storm Petersen (1982)
Erich Pontoppidan (1998)
Christian Poulsen (1991)
Valdemar Poulsen (1969)

R 
Rasmus Rask (1987)
Helge Refn (1985)
Poul Reichhardt (1986 semi-postal)
Poul Reumert (2000)
Ole Rømer (1944)
Borchardt Rollufse (1980)
Jørgen Ryg (1999)

S 
Peter Christian Skovgaard (1992)
Jens Søndergaard (1995)
Hans Christian Sonne (1967)
Nina Sten-Knudsen (2000)
Niels Stensen (1969)
Fritz Syberg (1988)

T 
Hans Tausen (1936)
Andreas Thiele (2001)
Bertel Thorvaldsen (1938)
Kurt Trampedach

U 
Arne Ungermann (1991)

V 
Valdemar I of Denmark (1980)
Hanne Varming (2002)

W 
Liva Weel (1999)
Alfred Wegener (1994)
Hans Wegner (1991)
Edvard Weie (1991)
Nikoline Werdelin (1992)
Peter Wessel (1990)
Jens Ferdinand (1997)
Bjørn Wiinblad (1986)
Niels Winkel (1988)
Ole Woldbye (2003)
Ole Worm (1988)
Troels Wörsel (1993)

Danish West Indies

Christian IX of Denmark (1905)
Christian X of Denmark (1915)
Frederik VIII of Denmark (1907)

Denmark
Stamps
Stamps
Philately of Denmark